Nets of Destiny is a 1924 British drama film directed by Arthur Rooke and starring Stewart Rome, Mary Odette and Gertrude McCoy. It was an adaptation of the novel The Salving of a Derelict by Maurice Drake. The screenplay concerns a son who tries to overturn the disgrace of his father, who committed suicide.

Cast
 Stewart Rome as Lawrence Averil
 Mary Odette as Marion Graham
 Gertrude McCoy as Constancae
 Cameron Carr as Reingold
 Judd Green as Captain Menzies
 Reginald Fox as Pat Dwyer
 Benson Kleve as Jack Menzies
 James English as Major Graham
 George Turner as Jerry Fisher
 Laura Walker as Mrs. Jardine

References

Bibliography
 Low, Rachael. The History of British Film, Volume 4 1918-1929. Routledge, 1997.

External links

1924 films
British silent feature films
1924 drama films
Films directed by Arthur Rooke
British drama films
British black-and-white films
1920s English-language films
1920s British films
Silent drama films
Butcher's Film Service films